The Iranian famine of 1942–1943 refers to a period of starvation that took place in Iran, which was under the rule of the Pahlavi dynasty. Iran at the time was occupied by the United Kingdom and Soviet Union despite being a neutral country in the Second World War.

During the occupation, both the British and the Soviets tried to strengthen their influence in their respective zones. The allies took control over the Iranian rail network and contracted half of Iran's publicly- and privately-owned trucks, thus occupying 75 percent of the country's food distribution capacity in the midst of the 1941 harvest. The remaining transportation capacities were quickly rendered unusable because of a restriction of the import of spare parts. That disrupted internal trade and social services and increased the cost of living by more than 700%. After a bad harvest in 1942, famine struck the British-occupied south. The British administration promised to supply the needed amount of grain, but failed to do so, and when the Iranian government turned to the United States for help, promised aid never substantiated even after months-long negotiations. The American diplomat Louis G. Dreyfus initially reported to the US government that the food situation was serious, but he soon uttered doubts about any wheat shortage and recommended that America should support "the British stand and insist on Iran helping itself before relying on Allied imports".

The British government blamed the situation on hoarding, inefficient distribution and an inadequate transport system, but Washington suspected that the British had deliberately manipulated the food supply to further their own political objectives. Meanwhile, the Soviets banned food shipments from the north, claimed that they needed the resources for the people and soldiers fighting the Germans and blamed British mismanagement for the famine since no similar conditions existed in the Soviet-held areas. The Iranian public accused the Allies of looting the country and pushing Iran into inflation and starvation. In December 1942, demonstrations against the scarcity of food became a daily occurrence in Tehran and eventually led to riots.

After nearly two weeks, Prime Minister Ahmad Qavam ordered the police to quell the protests with deadly force, resulting in a number of deaths and injuries on both sides. During the final months of 1942 and in 1943, the streets of Kermanshah were full of semi-naked and hungry people with fifteen deaths attributed to hunger and poverty occurring every day. In February 1943, typhus broke out in the city and the hospital was closed down because of widespread infection among doctors and staff. Only in 1943, the Soviets released 25,000 tons of grain to ameliorate the situation.

The devastating impact of World War II on Iran is acknowledged by the United States Holocaust Memorial Museum. In the entry in the Holocaust Encyclopedia on "Iran During World War II," the following is stated:

Death toll 
Very few academic sources discuss famine in Iran during World War II. For example, a 1968 demographic study by Julian Bharier in the journal Population Studies alludes to the war imposing additional hardships on Iranians, observing that "1946 is the first year after World War II when Iran began to find its feet again after the Allied occupation," but does not mention a famine or a large number of deaths. To the contrary, Bharier cites figures from Iran's Civil Registration Office (C.R.O.) postulating a 2% annual population growth rate during the years 1942-1945, which is higher than the average 1.5% growth rate estimated by demographer Mehdi Amani for the entire period 1926-1945. Cormac Ó Gráda included Iran in a 2019 analysis of World War II-era famines, briefly commenting that "the death toll, though unknown, was probably modest" and citing Bharier as a reference.

Mohammad Gholi Majd is the only author to have written a book about the famine. In the Journal of Iranian Islamic Period History, Majd concluded that three to four million Iranians—a quarter of the population—died of starvation and disease during the Allied occupation in World War II, citing U.S. State Department population figures for 1941 (15 million) and 1944 (10-12 million).

References 

1942 in Iran
1943 in Iran
1942 disasters in Iran
1943 disasters in Iran
Iran in World War II
Famines in Iran
20th-century famines